The 1999 Russian Figure Skating Championships took place in Moscow from January 4 to 7, 1999. Skaters competed in the disciplines of men's singles, ladies' singles, pair skating, and ice dancing. The results were one of the criteria used to pick the Russian teams to the 1999 World Championships and the 1999 European Championships.

Senior results

Men

Ladies

Pairs

Ice dancing
CD1: Paso, CD2: Blues

External links
 results

1998 in figure skating
Russian Figure Skating Championships, 1999
Figure skating
Russian Figure Skating Championships
January 1999 sports events in Russia